The R127 road is a regional road in Fingal, Ireland.

The official description of the R127 from the Roads Act 1993 (Classification of Regional Roads) Order 2012  reads:

R127: Blake's Cross - Skerries - Balbriggan, County Dublin

Between its junction with R132 at Blakes Cross and its junction with R132 at Dublin Street Balbriggan via Coldwinters, Bridetree; Rathmore Road at Lusk; Balcunnin; Dublin Road, Thomas Hand Street and Balbriggan Street in the town of Skerries; Barnageeragh: Lawless Terrace, Gibbons Terrace and Market Green in the town of Balbriggan all in the county of Fingal.

See also
Roads in Ireland
National primary road
National secondary road
Regional road

References

Regional roads in the Republic of Ireland
Roads in Fingal